Dalnyk River is a small steppe river in Odesa Raion, Odesa Oblast, Ukraine. The river has origine near the village Dachne, inflows to the Sukhyi Estuary near the village Nova Dolyna, making the series of freshwater ponds. The town of Velykyi Dalnyk is located on the banks of the river.

Rivers of Odesa Oblast